Anne Caroline Jenkin, Baroness Jenkin of Kennington ( Strutt;
born 8 December 1955) is a Conservative member of the House of Lords.

Early life
Jenkin was born Anne Caroline Strutt on 8 December 1955 to the Hon. Charles Richard Strutt and the Hon. Jean Elizabeth Davidson. Her father was a son of the physicist the 4th Baron Rayleigh by his first wife, Lady Hilda Clements. Her mother was a daughter of Conservative politicians J. C. C. Davidson, 1st Viscount Davidson and Baroness Northchurch.

Political career
Jenkin stood for election as a Member of Parliament in Glasgow Provan in the 1987 general election. In 2005, she co-founded Women2Win with Theresa May, a campaign to increase the number of female Conservative MPs. She is currently its co-chair with Mark Harper.

She co-founded the Conservative Friends of International Development in 2011.

She was created a life peer on 26 January 2011 as Baroness Jenkin of Kennington, of Hatfield Peverel in the County of Essex. She was introduced to the House of Lords on 27 January 2011, where she sits on the Conservative benches.

In 2013, she spoke in favour of equal marriage.

In 2014, she was a member of the all-party parliamentary group on Food Poverty and Hunger when it co-produced a report on food poverty, with the charity Feeding Britain. One of the report's findings was that there were 4  million people in the UK struggling to afford food. At the publication press conference on 8 December, she said that the report found that one cause of the rise of hunger and food bank use in the UK was because, "We [as a society] have lost a lot of our cooking skills, and poor people don't know how to cook." Later that day, in another interview about the report's launch, she apologised for the remark, saying she was speaking without a script and had made a mistake: "What I meant was as a society we have lost our ability to cook" which was a problem affecting low income families most severely.

In January 2018, Jenkin criticised what she claimed was language used by constituents to describe candidates during the 2017 general election. In the debate on social media regulation in the House of Lords, Jenkin claimed that a candidate had been referred to as a "fucking Tory cunt". Jenkin said: "During the election campaign in June, the Ealing Central and Acton Conservative candidate was met daily outside her home by a large group of Momentum and Labour activists yelling at her, and I quote—and please, my Lords, forgive the unparliamentary language and block your ears if you are sensitive or easily offended—“Fucking Tory cunt”. This young woman has a young child. How can this be acceptable?"

 Jenkin is a member of parliamentary committees on Intergenerational Fairness and Provision (since 2018) and Hybrid Instruments (since 2019). She has previously served on committees addressing Equality Act 2010 and Disability (2015–2016) and Charities (2016–2017).

In 2021, perceiving a conflict between rights of "trans-women and those of women and girls", Jenkin dissociated herself from recent stances of Stonewall, a charity she had previously supported, and declared herself "gender critical". In 2022, The Daily Telegraph reported that, with fellow "gender critical" parliamentarians Rosie Duffield and Joanna Cherry she was setting up a cross-party "biology policy unit", "to help ensure policies across the public sector that are based on gender identity theory are documented and scrutinised".

Other roles
Jenkin is a Trustee of Waste & Resources Action Programme, Cool Earth and Feeding Britain. She was previously a Trustee of UNICEF UK.

In 2016, Jenkin became founding chancellor of Writtle University College, on its achieving university college status. The college is in Essex and specialises in agricultural and horticultural courses.

In 2017, Jenkin was chair of the Centre for Social Justice Off the Scales working group on childhood obesity in England.

Personal life
Since 1988 she has been married to the Conservative Member of Parliament Bernard Jenkin, whose father was the Conservative life peer The Lord Jenkin of Roding. Jenkin and her husband have two sons.

Styles
 Miss Anne Strutt (1955–1988)
 The Hon. Mrs Bernard Jenkin (1988–2011)
 The Rt Hon. Baroness Jenkin of Kennington (2011–present)

References

1955 births
Conservative Party (UK) life peers
Living people
Place of birth missing (living people)
Life peers created by Elizabeth II
Life peeresses created by Elizabeth II
People from Hatfield Peverel
Strutt family
Scottish Conservative Party parliamentary candidates
Wives of knights
Spouses of British politicians